Hardscrabble is a historic plantation home located near Bahama, Durham County, North Carolina.  It consists of two houses, one Georgian and one Federal, covered by a common cross-gable roof in the late-19th century.  The Georgian was built about 1779 and the Federal section in the 1790s.

It was listed on the National Register of Historic Places in 1972.

References

Houses on the National Register of Historic Places in North Carolina
Georgian architecture in North Carolina
Federal architecture in North Carolina
Houses completed in 1779
Houses in Durham County, North Carolina
National Register of Historic Places in Durham County, North Carolina
Plantation houses in North Carolina